Amanda Bell (born August 3, 1988) in Oakland, California is an American mixed martial artist who competes in the Featherweight division. She previously competed in the Bellator MMA and Invicta FC.

Mixed martial arts career

Early career
A well rounded athlete, Bell currently holds a blue belt in Brazilian Jiu-Jitsu, and has a background in Karate, Aikido, Hung Gar and Tai Chi. Bell began her amateur MMA career in 2008. She earned six wins against one loss over the next three years.

Invicta FC
Bell made her professional MMA debut in January 2013 at Invicta FC 4: Esparza vs. Hyatt. She lost her debut against Tamikka Brents by unanimous decision.  After going 2-1 in regional promotions, she returned to Invicta FC on November 1, 2014 at Invicta FC 9: Honchak vs. Hashi. She defeated Maria Hougaard Djursaa by TKO in the first round.  In her third fight for the promotion, Bell faced Faith Van Duin on April 24, 2015 at Invicta FC 12: Kankaanpää vs. Souza. She lost the fight via submission in the second round.  In her fourth fight for the promotion, Bell faced Megan Anderson on May 7, 2016 at Invicta FC 17: Evinger vs. Schneider. She lost the bout via TKO in the first round.

Bellator MMA
In 2017, Bell made her Bellator MMA debut against Brittney Elkin at Bellator 181 on July 14, 2017. She won the fight via TKO in the second round.

Bell faced Talita Nogueira at Bellator 182 on August 25, 2017. She lost the fight via a rear-naked choke submission in the first round.

A year removed from her previous fight, Bell returned to action against Amber Leibrock at Bellator 215 on February 15, 2019. She won the fight via technical knockout in the first round.

Next she faced Arlene Blencowe at Bellator 224 on July 12, 2019. She lost the fight via first-minute knockout.

She faced Janay Harding at Bellator 233 on November 8, 2019. She won the fight via third-round knockout.

Bell faced Leslie Smith at Bellator 245 on September 11, 2020. She missed weight and lost the fight via unanimous decision. Subsequently, she signed a new multi-fight contract with the organization.

Bell faced Marina Mokhnatkina on June 11, 2021 at Bellator 260. She lost the bout via unanimous decision.

On July 10, 2021, it was announced that she was no longer under contract with Bellator.

Championships and accomplishments
Absolute Action MMA
2011 Absolute Action MMA Amateur featherweight title
AwakeningFighters.com
2014 Featherweight of the Year

Mixed martial arts record

|-
|Loss
|align=center|7–8
|Marina Mokhnatkina
|Decision (unanimous)
|Bellator 260
|
|align=center|3
|align=center|5:00
|Uncasville, Connecticut, United States
|
|-
|Loss
|align=center|7–7
|Leslie Smith
|Decision (unanimous)
|Bellator 245
|
|align=center| 3
|align=center| 5:00
|Uncasville, Connecticut, United States
| 
|-
|Win
|align=center|7–6
|Janay Harding
|TKO (punches)
|Bellator 233
|
|align=center| 3
|align=center| 4:44
|Thackerville, Oklahoma, United States
| 
|-
|Loss
|align=center|6–6
|Arlene Blencowe
|KO (punches)
|Bellator 224
|
|align=center| 1 
|align=center| 0:22
|Thackerville, Oklahoma, United States
| 
|-
|Win
|align=center|6–5
|Amber Leibrock
|TKO (punches)
|Bellator 215
|
|align=center| 1 
|align=center| 3:52
|Uncasville, Connecticut, United States
| 
|-
|Loss
|align="center" |5–5
|Talita Nogueira
|Submission (rear-naked choke)
|Bellator 182
|
|align="center" | 1
|align="center" | 3:44
|Verona, New York, United States
|
|-
|Win
|align="center" |5–4
|Brittney Elkin
|TKO (punches)
|Bellator 181
|
|align="center" | 2
|align="center" | 4:56
|Thackerville, Oklahoma, United States
|
|-
|Win
|align="center" |4–4
|Gabrielle Holloway
|Decision (unanimous)
|KOTC Heavy Trauma
|
|align="center" | 3
|align="center" | 5:00
|Lincoln City, Oregon, United States
|
|-
|Loss
|align="center" |3–4
|Megan Anderson
|TKO (head kick and punches)
|Invicta FC 17: Evinger vs. Schneider
|
|align="center" | 1
|align="center" | 5:00
|Costa Mesa, California, United States
|
|-
|Loss
|align="center" |3–3
|Faith Van Duin
|Submission (rear-naked choke)
|Invicta FC 12: Kankaanpää vs. Souza
|
|align="center" | 2
|align="center" | 0:38
|Kansas City, Missouri, United States
|
|-
|Win
|align="center" |3–2
|Maria Hougaard Djursaa
|TKO (punches)
|Invicta FC 9: Honchak vs. Hashi
|
|align="center" | 1
|align="center" | 4:56
|Davenport, Iowa, United States
|
|-
|Win
|align="center" |2–2
|Marina Shafir
|KO (punches)
|LOP Chaos at the Casino 5
|
|align="center" | 1
|align="center" | 0:37
|Inglewood, California, United States
|
|-
|Win
|align="center" |1–2
|Brittney Elkin
|Submission (rear-naked choke)
|SCL: Army vs. Marines 5
|
|align="center" | 2
|align="center" | 3:48
|Loveland, Colorado, United States
|
|-
|Loss
|align="center" |0–2
|Charmaine Tweet
|Submission (rear-naked choke)
|BFTB 2: Redemption
|
|align="center" | 1
|align="center" | 4:18
|Cranbrook, British Columbia, Canada
|
|-
|Loss
|align="center" |0–1
|Tamikka Brents
|Decision (unanimous)
|Invicta FC 4: Esparza vs. Hyatt
|
|align="center" | 3
|align="center" | 5:00
|Kansas City, Kansas, United States
|
|-
|}

See also
 List of female mixed martial artists

References

External links
 Amanda Bell at Awakening Fighters
 

1988 births
Living people
Sportspeople from Medford, Oregon
American female mixed martial artists
Featherweight mixed martial artists
Mixed martial artists utilizing karate
Mixed martial artists utilizing Brazilian jiu-jitsu
Mixed martial artists from Oregon
LGBT mixed martial artists
American female karateka
Bellator female fighters
American practitioners of Brazilian jiu-jitsu
Sportspeople from Oakland, California
Mixed martial artists from California
LGBT Brazilian jiu-jitsu practitioners
LGBT karateka
21st-century American LGBT people
21st-century American women